The Northern Territories of the Gold Coast, commonly known as the Northern Territories, was a British protectorate in Africa from 1901 until 1957. The protectorate was administered by the Governor of the Gold Coast under a Chief Commissioner residing at Gambaga. A number of treaties were concluded in the name of Her Britannic Majesty with the Chiefs of Bona, Dagarti, Wa and Mamprusi at Gambaga. These treaties were made in 1896. Under the treaties, the Chiefs agreed not to conclude treaties with any other Power or to cede territory or to accept protectorates without the consent of Her Britannic Majesty. The Northern Territories were constituted as a district in 1897. The Northern Territories were formally established as a protectorate in 1901 under the Northern Territories Order in Council 1901 made on 26 September 1901. The Northern Territories remained a protectorate until the Ghana Independence Act 1957 annexed the Northern Territories by providing that the territories included immediately before 6 March 1957 in the Gold Coast should, as from that day, form part of Her Majesty's dominions by the name of Ghana.

References

History of Ghana
Gold Coast (British colony)
1902 establishments in Africa